Malaysia Airlines Flight 370 (MH370/MAS370) was an international passenger flight operated by Malaysia Airlines that disappeared on 8 March 2014 while flying from Kuala Lumpur International Airport in Malaysia to its planned destination, Beijing Capital International Airport. The crew of the Boeing 777-200ER, registered as 9M-MRO, last communicated with air traffic control (ATC) around 38 minutes after takeoff when the flight was over the South China Sea. The aircraft was lost from ATC radar screens minutes later, but was tracked by military radar for another hour, deviating westward from its planned flight path, crossing the Malay Peninsula and Andaman Sea.

With all 227 passengers and 12 crew aboard presumed dead, the disappearance of Flight 370 was the deadliest incident involving a Boeing 777 and the deadliest in Malaysia Airlines' history until it was surpassed in both regards by Malaysia Airlines Flight 17, which was shot down while flying over conflict-stricken eastern Ukraine four months later on 17 July 2014. The combined loss caused significant financial problems for Malaysia Airlines, which was renationalised by the Malaysian government in August 2014.

The search for the missing airplane became the most expensive search in the history of aviation. It focused initially on the South China Sea and Andaman Sea, before analysis of the aircraft's automated communications with an Inmarsat satellite indicated a possible crash site somewhere in the southern Indian Ocean. The lack of official information in the days immediately after the disappearance prompted fierce criticism from the Chinese public, particularly from relatives of the passengers, as most people on board Flight 370 were of Chinese origin. Several pieces of debris washed ashore in the western Indian Ocean during 2015 and 2016; many of these were confirmed to have originated from Flight 370. After a three-year search across  of ocean failed to locate the aircraft, the Joint Agency Coordination Centre heading the operation suspended its activities in January 2017. A second search launched in January 2018 by private contractor Ocean Infinity also ended without success after six months.

Relying mostly on analysis of data from the Inmarsat satellite with which the aircraft last communicated, the Australian Transport Safety Bureau (ATSB) proposed initially that a hypoxia event was the most likely cause given the available evidence, although no consensus has been reached concerning this theory among investigators. At various stages of the investigation, possible hijacking scenarios were considered, including crew involvement, and suspicion of the airplane's cargo manifest; many disappearance theories regarding the flight have also been reported by the media. The Malaysian Ministry of Transport's final report from July 2018 was inconclusive, but highlighted Malaysian ATC's failures to attempt to communicate with the aircraft shortly after its disappearance. In the absence of a definitive cause of disappearance, air transport industry safety recommendations and regulations citing Flight 370 have been intended mostly to prevent a repetition of the circumstances associated with the loss. These include increased battery life on underwater locator beacons, lengthening of recording times on flight data recorders and cockpit voice recorders, and new standards for aircraft position reporting over the open ocean.

Timeline 

The aircraft, a Boeing 777-200ER operated by Malaysia Airlines, last made voice contact with ATC at 01:19 MYT, 8 March (17:19 UTC, 7 March) when it was over the South China Sea, less than an hour after takeoff.

The multinational search effort for the aircraft, which was to become the most expensive aviation search in history, began in the Gulf of Thailand and the South China Sea, where the aircraft's signal was last detected on secondary surveillance radar, and was soon extended to the Strait of Malacca and Andaman Sea. Analysis of satellite communications between the aircraft and Inmarsat's satellite communications network concluded that the flight continued until at least 08:19 and flew south into the southern Indian Ocean, although the precise location cannot be determined. Australia assumed charge of the search on 17 March, when the search effort began to emphasise the southern Indian Ocean. On 24 March, the Malaysian government noted that the final location determined by the satellite communication was far from any possible landing sites, and concluded, "Flight MH370 ended in the southern Indian Ocean." Several pieces of marine debris found on the coast of Africa and on Indian Ocean islands off the coast of Africa—the first discovered on 29 July 2015 on Réunion—have been confirmed as pieces of Flight 370. The bulk of the aircraft has not been located, prompting many theories about its disappearance.

In a previous search attempt, Malaysia had established a Joint Investigation Team (JIT) to investigate the incident, working with foreign aviation authorities and experts. Malaysia released a final report concerning Flight 370 in October 2017. Neither the crew nor the aircraft's communication systems relayed a distress signal, indications of bad weather, or technical problems before the aircraft vanished. Two passengers travelling on stolen passports were investigated, but eliminated as suspects. Malaysian police identified the captain as the prime suspect if human intervention was  the cause of the disappearance, after clearing all others on the flight of suspicion over possible motives. Power was lost to the aircraft's satellite data unit (SDU) at some point between 01:07 and 02:03; the SDU logged onto Inmarsat's satellite communication network at 02:25, which was three minutes after the aircraft had left the range of radar. Based on analysis of the satellite communications,  the aircraft was postulated to have turned south after passing north of Sumatra and the flight continued for six hours with little deviation in its track, ending when its fuel was exhausted.

With the loss of all 239 aboard, Flight 370 is the second-deadliest incident involving a Boeing 777 and the second-deadliest incident of Malaysia Airlines' history, second to Flight 17 in both categories. Malaysia Airlines was struggling financially, a problem that was exacerbated by a decrease of ticket sales after the disappearance of Flight 370 and the downing of Flight 17; the airline was renationalised by the end of 2014. The Malaysian government received significant criticism, especially from China, for failing to disclose information promptly during the early weeks of the search. Flight 370's disappearance brought to public attention the limits of aircraft tracking and flight recorders, including the limited battery life of underwater locator beacons (an issue that had been raised about four years earlier following the loss of Air France Flight 447, but had never been resolved). In response to Flight 370's disappearance, the International Civil Aviation Organization adopted new standards for aircraft position reporting over open ocean, extended recording time for cockpit voice recorders, and, starting from 2020, new aircraft designs will be required to have a means of recovering the flight recorders, or the information they contain, before they sink into the water.

Aircraft 

Flight 370 was operated with a Boeing 777-2H6ER, serial number 28420, registration 9M-MRO. It was the 404th Boeing 777 produced, first flown on 14 May 2002, and was delivered new to Malaysia Airlines on 31 May 2002. The aircraft was powered by two Rolls-Royce Trent 892 engines and configured to carry 282 passengers in total capacity. It had accumulated 53,471.6 hours and 7,526 cycles (takeoffs and landings) in service and had not previously been involved in any major incidents, though a minor incident while taxiing at Shanghai Pudong International Airport in August 2012 resulted in a broken wing tip. Its last maintenance "A check" was carried out on 23 February 2014. The aircraft was in compliance with all applicable Airworthiness Directives for the airframe and engines. A replenishment of the crew oxygen system was performed on 7 March 2014, a routine maintenance task; an examination of this procedure found nothing unusual.

The Boeing 777 was introduced in 1994 and has an excellent safety record. Since its first commercial flight in June 1995, the type has suffered only seven other hull losses: British Airways Flight 38 in 2008; a cockpit fire in a parked EgyptAir Flight 667 at Cairo International Airport in 2011; the crash of Asiana Airlines Flight 214 in 2013, in which three people died; Malaysia Airlines Flight 17, which was shot down over Ukraine, killing all 298 people aboard in July 2014; Emirates Flight 521, which crashed and burned out while landing at Dubai International Airport in August 2016; and in November 2017, the seventh Boeing 777 hull loss occurred when a Singapore Airlines 777-200ER was written off after catching fire and burning out at Singapore Changi Airport.

Passengers and crew 

The aircraft was carrying 12 Malaysian crew members and 227 passengers from 14 different nations. On the day of the disappearance, Malaysia Airlines released the names and nationalities of the passengers and crew, based on the flight manifest. The passenger list was later modified to include two Iranian passengers travelling on stolen Austrian and Italian passports.

Crew 
All 12 crew members—two pilots and 10 cabin crew—were Malaysian citizens.
 The pilot in command was 53-year-old Captain Zaharie Ahmad Shah from Penang. He joined Malaysia Airlines as a cadet pilot in 1981, and after training and receiving his commercial pilot's licence, he became a second officer with the airline in 1983. He was promoted to captain of Boeing 737-400 airliners in 1991, captain of Airbus A330-300 in 1996, and captain of Boeing 777-200 in 1998. He had been a type-rating instructor and a type-rating examiner since 2007. Zaharie had a total of 18,365 hours of flying experience.
 The co-pilot was 27-year-old First Officer Fariq Abdul Hamid. He joined Malaysia Airlines as a cadet pilot in 2007; after becoming a second officer of Boeing 737-400 airliners, he was promoted to first officer of the Boeing 737-400 in 2010 and then transitioned to the Airbus A330-300 in 2012. In November 2013, he began training as first officer of Boeing 777-200 aircraft. Flight 370 was his final training flight, and he was scheduled to be examined on his next flight. Fariq had accumulated 2,763 hours of flying experience.

Passengers 
Of the 227 passengers, 153 were Chinese citizens, including a group of 19 artists with six family members and four staff returning from a calligraphy exhibition of their work in Kuala Lumpur; 38 passengers were Malaysian. The remaining passengers were from 12 different countries. Twenty passengers, 12 of whom were from Malaysia and eight from China, were employees of Freescale Semiconductor.

Through a 2007 agreement with Malaysia Airlines, Tzu Chi (an international Buddhist organisation) immediately sent specially trained teams to Beijing and Malaysia to give emotional assistance to passengers' families. The airline also sent its own team of caregivers and volunteers and agreed to bear the expense of bringing family members of the passengers to Kuala Lumpur and providing them with accommodation, medical care, and counselling. Altogether, 115 family members of the Chinese passengers flew to Kuala Lumpur. Some other family members chose to remain in China, fearing they would feel too isolated in Malaysia.

Flight and disappearance 

Flight 370 was a scheduled flight in the early morning of Saturday, 8 March 2014, from Kuala Lumpur, Malaysia, to Beijing, China. It was one of two daily flights operated by Malaysia Airlines from its hub at Kuala Lumpur International Airport (KLIA) to Beijing Capital International Airport—scheduled to depart at 00:35 local time (MYT; UTC+08:00) and arrive at 06:30 local time (CST; UTC+08:00).

The planned flight duration was 5 hours and 34 minutes, which would consume an estimated  of jet fuel. The aircraft carried  of fuel, including reserves, allowing an endurance of 7 hours and 31 minutes.

Departure 
At 00:42 MYT, Flight 370 took off from runway 32R, and was cleared by air traffic control (ATC) to climb to flight level 180—approximately —on a direct path to navigational waypoint IGARI (located at ). Voice analysis has determined that the first officer communicated with ATC while the flight was on the ground and that the Captain communicated with ATC after departure. Shortly after departure, the flight was transferred from the airport's ATC to "Lumpur Radar" air traffic control on frequency 132.6 MHz. ATC over peninsular Malaysia and adjacent waters is provided by the Kuala Lumpur Area Control Centre (ACC); Lumpur Radar is the name of the frequency used for en route air traffic. At 01:01, Flight 370's crew reported to Lumpur Radar that they had reached flight level 350, which they confirmed again at 01:08.

Communication lost 

The aircraft's final transmission was an automated position report, sent using the Aircraft Communications Addressing and Reporting System (ACARS) protocol at 01:06 MYT. Among the data provided in this message was the total fuel remaining: . The last verbal signal to air traffic control occurred at 01:19:30, when Captain Zaharie acknowledged a transition from Lumpur Radar to Ho Chi Minh ACC:

The crew was expected to signal ATC in Ho Chi Minh City as the aircraft passed into Vietnamese airspace, just north of the point where contact was lost. The captain of another aircraft attempted to contact the crew of Flight 370 shortly after 01:30, using the international air distress  frequency, to relay Vietnamese air traffic control's request for the crew to contact them; the captain said he was able to establish communication, but only heard "mumbling" and static. Calls made to Flight 370's cockpit at 02:39 and 07:13 were unanswered, but acknowledged by the aircraft's satellite data unit.

Radar 

At 01:20:31 MYT, Flight 370 was observed on radar at the Kuala Lumpur ACC as it passed the navigational waypoint IGARI in the Gulf of Thailand; five seconds later, the Mode-S symbol disappeared from radar screens. At 01:21:13, Flight 370 disappeared from the radar screen at Kuala Lumpur ACC and was lost at about the same time on radar at Ho Chi Minh ACC, which reported that the aircraft was at the nearby waypoint BITOD. Air traffic control uses secondary radar, which relies on a signal emitted by a transponder on each aircraft; therefore, the ADS-B transponder was no longer functioning on Flight 370 after 01:21. The final transponder data indicated that the aircraft was flying at its assigned cruise altitude of flight level 350 and was travelling at  true airspeed. There were few clouds around this point, and no rain or lightning nearby. Later analysis estimated that Flight 370 had  of fuel when it disappeared from secondary radar.

At the time that the transponder stopped functioning, military radar showed Flight 370 turning right, but then beginning a left turn to a southwesterly direction. A civilian primary radar at Sultan Ismail Petra Airport with a  range made four detections of an unidentified aircraft between 01:30:37 and 01:52:35; the tracks of the unidentified aircraft are "consistent with those of the military data". At 01:52, Flight 370 was detected passing just south of the island of Penang. From there, the aircraft flew across the Strait of Malacca, passing close to the waypoint VAMPI, and Pulau Perak at 02:03, after which it flew along air route N571 to waypoints MEKAR, NILAM, and possibly IGOGU.

Countries were reluctant to release information collected from military radar because of sensitivity about revealing their capabilities. Indonesia has an early-warning radar system, but its ATC radar did not register any aircraft with the transponder code used by Flight 370, despite the aircraft possibly having flown near, or over, the northern tip of Sumatra. Indonesian military radar tracked Flight 370 earlier when en route to waypoint IGARI before the transponder is thought to have been turned off, but did not provide information on whether it was detected afterwards. Thailand and Vietnam also detected Flight 370 on radar before the transponder stopped working. The radar position symbols for the transponder code used by Flight 370 vanished after the transponder is thought to have been turned off. Vietnam's deputy minister of transport Pham Quy Tieu stated that Vietnam had noticed MH370 turning back toward the west and that its operators had twice informed Malaysian authorities the same day on 8 March. Thai military radar detected an aircraft that might have been Flight 370, but it is not known at what time the last radar contact was made, and the signal did not include identifying data.

Satellite communication resumes 
At 02:25 MYT, the aircraft's satellite communication system sent a "log-on request" message—the first message since the ACARS transmission at 01:07—which was relayed by satellite to a ground station, both operated by satellite telecommunications company Inmarsat. After logging on to the network, the satellite data unit aboard the aircraft responded to hourly status requests from Inmarsat and two ground-to-aircraft telephone calls, at 02:39 and 07:13, which were unanswered by the cockpit. The final status request and aircraft acknowledgement occurred at 08:10, about 1 hour and 40 minutes after it was scheduled to arrive in Beijing. The aircraft sent a log-on request at 08:19:29, which was followed, after a response from the ground station, by a "log-on acknowledgement" message at 08:19:37. The log-on acknowledgement is the last piece of data available from Flight 370. The aircraft did not respond to a status request from Inmarsat at 09:15.

Response by air traffic control 

At 01:38 MYT, Ho Chi Minh Area Control Centre (ACC) contacted Kuala Lumpur Area Control Centre to query the whereabouts of Flight 370 and informed Kuala Lumpur that ACC had not established verbal communication with Flight 370, which was last detected by radar at waypoint BITOD. The two centres exchanged four more calls during the next 20 minutes with no new information.

At 02:03, Kuala Lumpur ACC relayed to Ho Chi Minh ACC information received from Malaysia Airlines' operations centre that Flight 370 was in Cambodian airspace. Ho Chi Minh ACC contacted Kuala Lumpur ACC twice in the following eight minutes asking for confirmation that Flight 370 was in Cambodian airspace. At 02:15, the watch supervisor at Kuala Lumpur ACC queried Malaysia Airlines' operations centre, which said that it could exchange signals with Flight 370 and that Flight 370 was in Cambodian airspace. Kuala Lumpur ACC contacted Ho Chi Minh ACC to ask whether the planned flight path for Flight 370 passed through Cambodian airspace. Ho Chi Minh ACC responded that Flight 370 was not supposed to enter Cambodian airspace and that they had already contacted Phnom Penh ACC (which controls Cambodian airspace), which had no communication with Flight 370. Later, another Malaysia Airlines aircraft (Flight 386 bound for Shanghai) attempted, at the request of Ho Chi Minh ACC, to contact Flight 370 on the Lumpur Radar frequency – the frequency on which Flight 370 last made contact with Malaysian air traffic control – and on emergency frequencies. The attempt was unsuccessful.

At 03:30, Malaysia Airlines' operations centre informed Kuala Lumpur ACC that the locations it had provided earlier were "based on flight projection and not reliable for aircraft positioning." Over the next hour, Kuala Lumpur ACC contacted Ho Chi Minh ACC asking whether they had signalled Chinese air traffic control. At 05:09, Singapore ACC was queried for information about Flight 370. At 05:20, an undisclosed official contacted Kuala Lumpur ACC requesting information about Flight 370; he opined that, based on known information, "MH370 never left Malaysian airspace."

The watch supervisor at Kuala Lumpur ACC activated the Kuala Lumpur Aeronautical Rescue Coordination Centre (ARCC) at 05:30, more than four hours after communication was lost with Flight 370. The ARCC is a command post at an Area Control Centre that coordinates search-and-rescue activities when an aircraft is lost.

Presumed loss 
Malaysia Airlines issued a media statement at 07:24 MYT, one hour after the scheduled arrival time of the flight at Beijing, stating that communication with the flight had been lost by Malaysian ATC at 02:40 and that the government had initiated search-and-rescue operations; the time when contact was lost was later corrected to 01:21. Neither the crew nor the aircraft's communication systems relayed a distress signal, indications of bad weather, or technical problems before the aircraft vanished from radar screens.

On 24 March, Malaysian Prime Minister Najib Razak appeared before media at 22:00 local time to give a statement regarding Flight 370, during which he announced that he had been briefed by the Air Accidents Investigation Branch that it and Inmarsat (the satellite data provider) had concluded that the airliner's last position before it disappeared was in the southern Indian Ocean. As no places exist where it could have landed, the aircraft must therefore have crashed into the sea.

Just before Najib spoke at 22:00 MYT, an emergency meeting was called in Beijing for relatives of Flight 370 passengers. Malaysia Airlines announced that Flight 370 was assumed lost with no survivors. It notified most of the families in person or via telephone, and some received an SMS (in English and Chinese) informing them that the aircraft likely had crashed with no survivors.

On 29 January 2015, the director general of the Department of Civil Aviation Malaysia, Azharuddin Abdul Rahman, announced that the status of Flight 370 would be changed to an "accident", in accordance with the Chicago Convention on International Civil Aviation, and that all passengers and crew are presumed to have lost their lives.

If the official assumption is confirmed, Flight 370 was, at the time of its disappearance, the deadliest aviation incident in the history of Malaysian Airlines, surpassing the 1977 hijacking and crash of Malaysian Airline System Flight 653 that killed all 100 passengers and crew aboard, and the deadliest involving a Boeing 777, surpassing Asiana Airlines Flight 214 (three fatalities). In both of those categories, Flight 370 was surpassed 131 days later by Malaysia Airlines Flight 17, another Boeing 777-200ER, which was shot down on 17 July 2014, killing all 298 people aboard.

Reported sightings 
The news media reported several sightings of an aircraft fitting the description of the missing Boeing 777. For example, on 19 March 2014, CNN reported that witnesses including fishermen, an oil rig worker, and people on the Kuda Huvadhoo atoll in the Maldives saw the missing airliner. Three months later, The Daily Telegraph reported that a British woman sailing in the Indian Ocean claimed to have seen an aircraft on fire.

Search 

A search-and-rescue effort was launched in southeast Asia soon after the disappearance of Flight 370. Following the initial analysis of communications between the aircraft and a satellite, the surface search was moved to the southern Indian Ocean one week after the aircraft's disappearance. With effect from 30 March 2014, the search was coordinated by the Joint Agency Coordination Centre (JACC), an Australian government agency that was established specifically to manage the effort to locate and recover Flight 370, and which primarily involved the Malaysian, Chinese, and Australian governments.

On 17 January 2017, the official search for Flight 370—which had proven to be the most expensive search operation in aviation history—was suspended after yielding no evidence of the aircraft other than some marine debris on the coast of Africa. The final ATSB report, published on 3 October 2017, stated that the underwater search for the aircraft, had cost a total of US$155 million. The underwater search accounted for 86% of this amount, bathymetry 10%, and programme management 4%. Malaysia had supported 58% of the total cost, Australia 32%, and China 10%.

In January 2018, the private American marine-exploration company Ocean Infinity resumed the search for MH370 in the narrowed 25,000 km2 area, using the Norwegian ship Seabed Constructor. The search area was significantly extended during the course of the search, and by the end of May 2018, the vessel had searched a total area of more than  using eight autonomous underwater vehicles (AUVs). The contract with the Malaysian government ended soon afterward, and the search was concluded without success on 9 June 2018.

Southeast Asia 
 
The Kuala Lumpur Aeronautical Rescue Coordination Centre (ARCC) was activated at 05:30 MYT—four hours after communication was lost with the aircraft—to coordinate search and rescue efforts. Search efforts began in the Gulf of Thailand and the South China Sea. On the second day of the search, Malaysian officials said that radar recordings indicated that Flight 370 may have turned around before vanishing from radar screens; the search zone was expanded to include part of the Strait of Malacca.

Records of signals sent between the aircraft and a communications satellite over the Indian Ocean revealed that the plane had continued flying for almost six hours after its final sighting on Malaysian military radar. Initial analysis of these communications determined that Flight 370 was along one of two arcs—equidistant from the satellite—when its last signal was sent. On 15 March, the same day upon which the analysis was disclosed publicly, authorities announced that they would abandon search efforts in the South China Sea, Gulf of Thailand, and Strait of Malacca in order to focus their efforts on the two corridors. The northern arc—from northern Thailand to Kazakhstan—was soon discounted, for the aircraft would have had to pass through heavily militarised airspace, and those countries claimed that their military radar would have detected an unidentified aircraft entering their airspace.

Southern Indian Ocean 

The emphasis of the search was shifted to the southern Indian Ocean west of Australia and within Australia's aeronautical and maritime Search and Rescue regions that extend to 75°E longitude. Accordingly, on 17 March, Australia agreed to manage the search in the southern locus from Sumatra to the southern Indian Ocean.

Initial search 
The search area, which Australian prime minister Tony Abbott called "as close to nowhere as it's possible to be", is renowned for its strong winds, inhospitable climate, hostile seas, and deep ocean floors. Satellite imagery of the region was analysed; several objects of interest and two possible debris fields were identified on images made between 16 and 26 March. None of these possible objects were found by aircraft or ships.

Between 2 and 17 April, an effort was made to detect the underwater locator beacons (ULBs, informally known as "pingers") attached to the aircraft's flight recorders, because the beacons' batteries were expected to expire around 7 April. Australian naval cutter ADV Ocean Shield, equipped with a towed pinger locator (TPL), joined China's Haixun 01, equipped with a hand-held hydrophone, and the Royal Navy's HMS Echo, equipped with a hull-mounted hydrophone, in the search. Between 4 and 8 April, several acoustic detections were made that were close to the frequency and rhythm of the sound emitted by the flight recorders' ULBs; analysis of the acoustic detections determined that, although unlikely, the detections could have come from a damaged ULB. A sonar search of the seafloor near the detections was carried out between 14 April and 28 May but yielded no sign of Flight 370. In a March 2015 report, it was revealed that the battery of the ULB attached to Flight 370's flight data recorder may have expired in December 2012 and thus may not have been as capable of sending signals as would an unexpired battery.

Underwater search 

In late June 2014, details of the next phase of the search were announced; officials have called this phase the "underwater search" despite the previous seafloor sonar survey. Continued refinement of the analysis of Flight 370's satellite communications identified a "wide area search" along the "7th arc" where Flight 370 was located when it last communicated with the satellite. The priority search area was in the southern extent of the wide area search. Available bathymetric data for this region was of poor resolution, thus necessitating a bathymetric survey of the search area before the underwater phase began.

The governments of Malaysia, China, and Australia made a joint commitment to thoroughly search  of seafloor. This phase of the search, which began on 6 October 2014, used three vessels equipped with towed deep-water vehicles that use side-scan sonar, multi-beam echo sounders, and video cameras to locate and identify aircraft debris. A fourth vessel participated in the search between January and May 2015, using an AUV to search areas that could not be effectively searched using equipment on the other vessels. Following the discovery of the flaperon on Réunion, the Australian Transport Safety Bureau (ATSB) reviewed its drift calculations for debris from the aircraft and, according to the JACC, was satisfied that the search area was still the most likely crash site. Reverse drift modelling of the debris, to determine its origin after 16 months, also supported the underwater search area, although this method is very imprecise over long periods. On 17 January 2017, the three countries jointly announced the suspension of the search for Flight 370.

2018 search
On 17 October 2017, Dutch-based Fugro and American company Ocean Infinity offered to resume the search for the aircraft. In January 2018, Ocean Infinity announced that it was planning to resume the search in the narrowed  area. The search attempt was approved by the Malaysian government, provided that payment would be made only if the wreckage were found. Ocean Infinity chartered the Norwegian ship Seabed Constructor to perform the search.

In late January, it was reported that the AIS tracking system had detected the vessel reaching the search zone on 21 January. In April, a report by Ocean Infinity revealed that "site 4", farther northeast along the 7th arc, had been added to the search plan. The final phase of the search was conducted in "site 4" in May 2018, "before the weather limits Ocean Infinity's ability to continue working this year." Malaysia's new transport minister Loke Siew Fook announced on 23 May 2018 that the search for MH370 would conclude at the end of the month. Ocean Infinity confirmed on 31 May that its contract with the Malaysian government had ended, and it was reported on 9 June 2018 that the Ocean Infinity search had come to an end. Ocean-floor mapping data collected during the search have been donated to the Nippon Foundation–GEBCO Seabed 2030 Project, to be incorporated into the global map of the ocean floor.

In March 2019, in the wake of the fifth anniversary of the disappearance, the Malaysian government stated that it was willing to look at any "credible leads or specific proposals" regarding a new search. Ocean Infinity stated that it was ready to resume the search on the same no-find, no-fee basis, believing that it would benefit from the experience that it had gained from its search for the wreck of Argentinian submarine ARA San Juan and bulk carrier ship Stellar Daisy. Ocean Infinity believed that the most probable location was still somewhere along the 7th arc around the area identified previously and upon which its 2018 search was based. In March 2022, Ocean Infinity committed to resuming its search in 2023 or 2024, pending approval by the Malaysian government.

Marine debris 
By October 2017, 20 pieces of debris believed to be from 9M-MRO had been recovered from beaches in the western Indian Ocean; 18 of the items were "identified as being very likely or almost certain to originate from MH370", while the other two were "assessed as probably from the accident aircraft."

Flaperon

The first item of debris to be positively identified as originating from Flight 370 was the right flaperon (a trailing edge control surface). The item was transported from Réunion (an overseas department of France) to Toulouse, where it was examined by France's civil aviation accident investigation agency, the Bureau d'Enquêtes et d'Analyses pour la Sécurité de l'Aviation Civile (BEA), and a French defence ministry laboratory. Malaysia sent its own investigators to both Réunion and Toulouse. On 3 September 2015, French officials announced that serial numbers found on internal components of the flaperon linked it "with certainty" to Flight 370. These serial numbers were retrieved using a borescope.

After the discovery, French police conducted a search of the waters around Réunion for additional debris, and found a damaged suitcase that might  be linked to Flight 370. The location of the discovery was consistent with models of debris dispersal 16 months after an origin in the search area then in progress off the west coast of Australia. A Chinese water bottle and an Indonesian cleaning product were also found in the same area.

In August 2015, France carried out an aerial search for possible marine debris around the island, covering an area of  along the east coast of Réunion. Foot patrols were also planned to search for debris along the beaches. Malaysia asked authorities in neighbouring states to be on the alert for marine debris that might have come from an aircraft. On 14 August, it was announced that no debris that could be traced to Flight 370 had been found at sea off Réunion, but that some items had been found on land. Air and sea searches for debris ended on 17 August.

Parts from the right stabiliser and right wing
In late February 2016, an object bearing a stencilled label of "NO STEP" was found off the coast of Mozambique; early photographic analysis suggested that it could have come from the aircraft's horizontal stabiliser or from the leading edges of the wings. The fragment was sent to Australia, where experts identified it as almost certainly a horizontal stabiliser panel from MH370.

The piece was flown to Australia for analysis. It carried a stencilled code 676EB, which identified it as part of a Boeing 777 flap track fairing, and the style of lettering matched that of stencils used by Malaysia Airlines, making it almost certain that the part came from 9M-MRO.

The locations where the objects were found are consistent with the drift model performed by CSIRO, further corroborating that the parts could have come from Flight 370.

Other debris
On 7 March 2016, more debris, possibly from the aircraft, was found on the island of Réunion. Ab Aziz Kaprawi, Malaysia's deputy transport minister, said that "an unidentified grey item with a blue border" might be linked to Flight 370. Both Malaysian and Australian authorities, coordinating the search in the South Indian Ocean, sent teams to verify whether the debris was from the missing aircraft.

On 21 March 2016, South African archaeologist Neels Kruger found a grey piece of debris on a beach near Mossel Bay, South Africa, that had an unmistakable partial logo of Rolls-Royce, the manufacturer of the missing aircraft's engines. The Malaysian ministry of transport acknowledged that the piece could be that of an engine cowling. An additional piece of possible debris, suggested to have come from the interior of the aircraft, was found on the island of Rodrigues, Mauritius, in late March. On 11 May 2016, Australian authorities determined that the two pieces of debris were "almost certainly" from Flight 370.

Flap and further search
On 24 June 2016, Australian transport minister Darren Chester said that a piece of aircraft debris had been found on Pemba Island, off the coast of Tanzania. It was handed over to the authorities so that experts from Malaysia could determine its origin. On 20 July, the Australian government released photographs of the piece, which was believed to be an outboard flap from one of the aircraft's wings. Malaysia's transport ministry confirmed on 15 September that the debris was indeed from the missing aircraft.

On 21 November 2016, families of the victims announced that they would carry out a search for debris in December on the island of Madagascar. On 30 November 2018, five pieces of debris recovered between December 2016 and August 2018 on the Malagasy coast, and believed by victims' relatives to be from MH370, were handed to Malaysian transport minister Anthony Loke.

Texas A&M University mathematics professor Goong Chen has argued that the plane may have entered the sea vertically; any other angle of entry would have splintered the airplane to many pieces, which would have necessarily been found already.

Investigation

International participation 
Malaysia quickly assembled a Joint Investigation Team (JIT), consisting of specialists from Malaysia, China, the United Kingdom, the United States, and France, which was led in accordance with ICAO standards by "an independent investigator in charge". The team consisted of an airworthiness group, an operations group, and a medical and human factors group. The airworthiness group were tasked with examining issues relating to maintenance records, structures, and systems of the aircraft; the operations group were to review the flight recorders, operations, and meteorology; and the medical and human factors group would investigate psychological, pathological, and survival factors. Malaysia also announced, on 6 April 2014, that it had set up three ministerial committees: a Next of Kin Committee, a committee to organise the formation of the JIT, and a committee responsible for the Malaysian assets deployed in the search effort. The criminal investigation was led by the Royal Malaysia Police, assisted by Interpol and other relevant international law enforcement authorities.

On 17 March, Australia took control of co-ordinating the search, rescue, and recovery operations. For the next six weeks, the Australian Maritime Safety Authority (AMSA) and ATSB worked to determine the search area, correlating information with the JIT and other government and academic sources, while the Joint Agency Coordination Centre (JACC) coordinated the search efforts. Following the fourth phase of the search, the ATSB took responsibility for defining the search area. In May, a search strategy working group was established by the ATSB to determine the most likely position of the aircraft at the 00:19 UTC (08:19 MYT) satellite transmission. The working group included aircraft and satellite experts from: Air Accidents Investigation Branch (UK), Boeing (US), Defence Science and Technology Group (Australia), Department of Civil Aviation (Malaysia), Inmarsat (UK), National Transportation Safety Board (US), and Thales (France).

, France was the only country that was continuing the investigation (by means of its Air Transport Gendarmerie), with the intention of verifying all of the technical data transmitted, particularly those provided by Inmarsat.

Interim and final reports 
On 8 March 2015, exactly one year after the disappearance of Flight 370, the Malaysian Ministry of Transport issued an interim report titled "Factual Information: Safety Information for MH370", which focused on providing factual information about the missing airplane, rather than the analysis of possible causes of the disappearance. A brief update statement was provided one year later, in March 2016, regarding the status of the investigation.

The final ATSB report was published on 3 October 2017. The final report from the Malaysian Ministry of Transport, dated 2 July 2018, was released to the public in Kuala Lumpur on 30 July 2018. This report did not provide any new information concerning the fate of MH370, but it did indicate errors made by Malaysian air traffic controllers in their limited efforts to communicate with the aircraft. Following these accounts of air traffic control failings, the Chairman of the Civil Aviation Authority of Malaysia, Azharuddin Abdul Rahman, resigned on 31 July 2018.

Analysis of satellite communication 

The communications between Flight 370 and the satellite communication network operated by Inmarsat, which were relayed by the Inmarsat-3 F1 satellite, provide the only significant clues to the location of Flight 370 after disappearing from Malaysian military radar at 02:22 MYT. These communications have also been used to infer possible in-flight events. The investigative team was challenged with reconstructing the flight path of Flight 370 from a limited set of transmissions with no explicit information about the aircraft's location, heading, or speed.

Technical background 

Aeronautical satellite communication (SATCOM) systems are used to transmit messages sent from the aircraft cockpit, as well as automated data signals from onboard equipment, using the ACARS communications protocol. SATCOM may also be used for the transmission of FANS and ATN messages, and for providing voice, fax and data links using other protocols. The aircraft uses a satellite data unit (SDU) to send and receive signals over the satellite communications network; this operates independently from the other onboard systems that communicate via SATCOM, mostly using the ACARS protocol. Signals from the SDU are transmitted to a communications satellite, which amplifies the signal and changes its frequency before relaying it to a ground station, where the signal is processed and, if applicable, routed to its intended destination (e.g. Malaysia Airlines' operations centre); signals are sent from the ground to the aircraft in reverse order.

When the SDU is first powered on, it attempts to connect with the Inmarsat network by transmitting a log-on request, which is acknowledged by the ground station. This is partly to determine whether the SDU belongs to an active service subscriber, and also to identify which satellite should be used for transmitting messages to the SDU. After connecting, if no further contact has been received from the data terminal (the SDU) for one hour, the ground station transmits a "log-on interrogation" message, commonly referred to as a "ping"; if the terminal is active, it will respond to the ping automatically. The entire process of interrogating the terminal is referred to as a "handshake".

Communications from 02:25 to 08:19 MYT 
Although the ACARS data link on Flight 370 stopped functioning between 01:07 and 02:03 MYT (most likely around the same time the plane lost contact by secondary radar), the SDU remained operative. After last contact by primary radar west of Malaysia, the following events were recorded in the log of Inmarsat's ground station at Perth, Western Australia (all times are MYT/UTC+8):
 02:25:27 – First handshake ("log-on request" initiated by aircraft)
 02:39:52 – Ground to aircraft telephone call, acknowledged by SDU, unanswered
 03:41:00 – Second handshake (initiated by ground station)
 04:41:02 – Third handshake (initiated by ground station)
 05:41:24 – Fourth handshake (initiated by ground station)
 06:41:19 – Fifth handshake (initiated by ground station)
 07:13:58 – Ground to aircraft telephone call, acknowledged by SDU, unanswered
 08:10:58 – Sixth handshake (initiated by ground station)
 08:19:29 – Seventh handshake (initiated by aircraft); widely reported as a "partial handshake'", consisting of the following two transmissions:
 08:19:29.416 – "log-on request" message transmitted by aircraft (seventh "partial" handshake)
 08:19:37.443 – "log-on acknowledge" message transmitted by aircraft (last transmission received from Flight 370)
The aircraft did not respond to a ping at 09:15.

Inferences 
A few inferences can be made from the satellite communications. The first is that the aircraft remained operational until at least 08:19 MYT—seven hours after final contact was made with air traffic control over the South China Sea. The varying burst frequency offset (BFO) values indicate the aircraft was moving at speed. The aircraft's SDU needs location and track information to keep its antenna pointed towards the satellite, so it can also be inferred that the aircraft's navigation system was operational.

Since the aircraft did not respond to a ping at 09:15, it can be concluded that at some point between 08:19 and 09:15, the aircraft lost the ability to communicate with the ground station. The log-on message sent from the aircraft at 08:19:29 was "log-on request"; there are only a few reasons the SDU would transmit this request, such as a power interruption, software failure, loss of critical systems providing input to the SDU, or a loss of the link due to the aircraft's attitude. Investigators consider the most likely reason to be that it was sent during power-up after an electrical outage.

At 08:19, the aircraft had been airborne for 7 hours and 38 minutes; the typical Kuala Lumpur-Beijing flight is 5 hours, so fuel exhaustion was likely. In the event of fuel exhaustion and engine flame-out, which would eliminate power to the SDU, the aircraft's ram air turbine (RAT) would deploy, providing power to some instruments and flight controls, including the SDU. Approximately 90 seconds after the 02:25 handshake—also a log-on request—communications from the aircraft's in-flight entertainment system were recorded in the ground station log. Similar messages would be expected following the 08:19 handshake, but none were received, supporting the fuel-exhaustion scenario.

Analysis 

Two parameters associated with these transmissions that were recorded in a log at the ground station were key to the investigation:
 Burst time offset (BTO) – the time difference between when a signal is sent from the ground station and when the response is received. This measure is proportional to twice the distance from the ground station via the satellite to the aircraft and includes the time that the SDU takes between receiving and responding to the message and time between reception and processing at the ground station. This measure was analysed to determine the distance between the satellite and the aircraft at the time each of the seven handshakes occurred, and thereby defining seven circles on the Earth's surface the points on whose circumference are equidistant from the satellite at the calculated distance. Those circles were then reduced to arcs by eliminating those parts of each circle that lay outside the aircraft's range.
 Burst frequency offset (BFO) – the difference between the expected and received frequency of transmissions. The difference is caused by Doppler shifts as the signals travelled from the aircraft to the satellite to the ground station; the frequency translations made in the satellite and at the ground station; a small, constant error (bias) in the SDU that results from drift and ageing; and compensation applied by the SDU to counter the Doppler shift on the uplink. This measure was analysed to determine the aircraft's speed and heading, but multiple combinations of speed and heading can be valid solutions.
By combining the distance between the aircraft and satellite, speed, and heading with aircraft performance constraints (e.g. fuel consumption, possible speeds and altitudes), investigators generated candidate paths that were analysed separately by two methods. The first assumed the aircraft was flying on one of the three autopilot modes (two are further affected by whether the navigation system used magnetic north or true north as a reference), calculated the BTO and BFO values along these routes, and compared them with the values recorded from Flight 370. The second method generated paths which had the aircraft's speed and heading adjusted at the time of each handshake to minimise the difference between the calculated BFO of the path and the values recorded from Flight 370. A probability distribution for each method at the BTO arc of the sixth handshake of the two methods was created and then compared; 80% of the highest probability paths for both analyses combined intersect the BTO arc of the sixth handshake between 32.5°S and 38.1°S, which can be extrapolated to 33.5°S and 38.3°S along the BTO arc of the seventh handshake.

Possible in-flight events

Power interruption 
The SATCOM link functioned normally from pre-flight (beginning at 00:00 MYT) until it responded to a ground-to-air ACARS message with an acknowledge message at 01:07. Ground-to-air ACARS messages continued to be transmitted to Flight 370 until Inmarsat's network sent multiple "Request for Acknowledge" messages at 02:03, without a response from the aircraft. At some time between 01:07 and 02:03, power was lost to the SDU. At 02:25, the aircraft's SDU sent a "log-on request". It is uncommon for a log-on request to be made in-flight, but it could occur for multiple reasons. An analysis of the characteristics and timing of these requests suggest a power interruption in-flight is the most likely culprit.

Unresponsive crew or hypoxia 
An analysis by the ATSB comparing the evidence available for Flight 370 with three categories of accidents—an in-flight upset (e.g., stall), a glide event (e.g., engine failure, fuel exhaustion), and an unresponsive crew or hypoxia event—concluded that an unresponsive crew or hypoxia event "best fit the available evidence" for the five-hour period of the flight as it travelled south over the Indian Ocean without communication or significant deviations in its track, likely on autopilot. No consensus exists among investigators on the unresponsive crew or hypoxia theory. If no control inputs were made following flameout and the disengagement of autopilot, the aircraft would likely have entered a spiral dive and entered the ocean within  of the flameout and disengagement of autopilot.

The analysis of the flaperon showed that the landing flaps were not extended, supporting the spiral dive at high speed theory. In May 2018, the ATSB again asserted that the flight was not in control when it crashed, its spokesperson adding that "We have quite a bit of data to tell us that the aircraft, if it was being controlled at the end, it wasn't very successfully being controlled."

Speculated causes of disappearance

Passenger involvement 
Two men boarded Flight 370 with stolen passports, which raised suspicion in the immediate aftermath of its disappearance. The passports, one Austrian and one Italian, had been reported stolen in Thailand within the preceding two years. Interpol stated that both passports were listed on its Stolen and Lost Travel Documents (SLTD) database, and that no check had been made against the database since the passports were first reported as stolen. Malaysia's Home Minister, Ahmad Zahid Hamidi, criticised his country's immigration officials for failing to stop the passengers travelling with the stolen European passports. The two one-way tickets purchased for the holders of these passports were booked through China Southern Airlines. It was reported that an Iranian had ordered the cheapest tickets to Europe via telephone in Bangkok, Thailand, and paid by cash. The two passengers were later identified as Iranian men, one aged 19 and the other 29, who had entered Malaysia on 28 February using valid Iranian passports. The two men were believed to be asylum seekers. The Secretary General of Interpol stated that the organisation was "inclined to conclude that it was not a terrorist incident".

United States and Malaysian officials reviewed the backgrounds of every passenger named on the manifest. On 18 March, the Chinese government announced that it had checked all of the Chinese citizens on the aircraft and had ruled out the possibility that any were involved in "destruction or terror attacks". One passenger, who worked as a flight engineer for a Swiss jet charter company, was briefly under suspicion as a potential hijacker because he was thought to have the relevant "aviation skills".

Crew involvement 
US officials believe the most likely explanation to be that someone in the cockpit of Flight 370 re-programmed the aircraft's autopilot to travel south across the Indian Ocean. Police searched the homes of the pilots and seized financial records for all 12 crew members, including bank statements, credit card bills and mortgage documents. On 2 April 2014, Malaysia's Police Inspector-General said that more than 170 interviews had been conducted as part of Malaysia's criminal investigation, including interviews with family members of the pilots and crew.

Media reports claimed that Malaysian police had identified Captain Zaharie as the prime suspect, if human intervention were eventually proven to be the cause of Flight 370's disappearance. The United States' Federal Bureau of Investigation (FBI) reconstructed the deleted data from Captain Zaharie's home flight simulator, but a Malaysian government spokesman indicated that "nothing sinister" had been found on it. The preliminary report issued by Malaysia in March 2015 stated that there was "no evidence of recent or imminent significant financial transactions carried out" by any of the pilots or crew, and that analysis of the behaviour of the pilots on CCTV showed "no significant behavioural changes".

In 2016, the magazine New York wrote that a confidential document from the Malaysian police investigation showed an FBI analysis of the flight simulator's computer hard drive found a route on the pilot's home flight simulator that closely matched the projected flight over the Indian Ocean and that this evidence had been withheld from the publicly released investigative report. The New York wrote as follows:

The FBI findings were later confirmed by the ATSB, although the agency stressed that this did not prove the pilot's involvement. The find was similarly confirmed by the Malaysian government.

In 2018, the sister of the pilot said that the safety investigation report on MH370 showed "nothing negative" about the pilot flying the plane. According to the report, "There were seven 'manually programmed' waypoint coordinates that, when connected together, will create a flight path from KLIA to an area south of the Indian Ocean through the Andaman Sea. But a forensic report concluded there were no unusual activities other than game-related flight simulations." The waypoints were recovered from a backup file dated 3 February 2014 but the report reached no conclusion regarding the dates they had been set.

Cargo 
The mangosteens were loaded into the aft cargo bay of the aircraft at Kuala Lumpur International Airport, and inspected by officials from Malaysia's Federal Agriculture Marketing Authority before being loaded onto Flight 370. According to the head of Malaysian police, Khalid Abu Bakar, the people who handled the mangosteens and the Chinese importers were questioned to rule out sabotage.

The lithium-ion batteries were contained in a  consignment being shipped from Motorola Solutions facilities in Bayan Lepas, Malaysia, to Tianjin, China; the rest of the consignment consisted of walkie-talkie chargers and accessories. The batteries were assembled on 7 March and the consignment was transported to the Penang Cargo Complex—operated by MASkargo (Malaysia Airlines' cargo subsidiary)—where it was loaded onto a lorry for transfer to Kuala Lumpur International Airport and onwards by air to Beijing. At the Penang Cargo Complex, the consignment was inspected by MASkargo employees and Malaysian customs officials, but did not go through a security screening before the lorry was sealed for transfer to the airport. The consignment did not go through any additional inspections at Kuala Lumpur International Airport before being loaded onto Flight 370; it was divided among two pallets in the forward cargo bay of the aircraft and one pallet placed in the rear of the aft cargo bay. The batteries were packaged in accordance with IATA guidelines, so they were not regulated as dangerous goods.

Lithium-ion batteries can cause intense fires if they overheat and ignite, which has led to strict regulations on their transport aboard aircraft. A fire fuelled by lithium-ion batteries caused the crash of UPS Airlines Flight 6, and lithium-ion batteries are suspected to have caused a fire which resulted in the crash of Asiana Airlines Flight 991; both were cargo aircraft. Some airlines have stopped carrying bulk shipments of lithium-ion batteries on passenger aircraft, citing safety concerns.

Aftermath

Criticism of Malaysian authorities' management of information 
Public communication from Malaysian officials regarding the loss of Flight 370 was initially beset with confusion. The Malaysian government and the airline released imprecise, incomplete, and occasionally inaccurate information, with civilian officials sometimes contradicting military leaders. Malaysian officials were criticised for such persistent release of contradictory information, most notably regarding the last location and time of contact with the aircraft.

Malaysia's acting Transport Minister Hishammuddin Hussein, who was also the country's Defence Minister (until May 2018), denied the existence of problems between the participating countries, but academics explained that because of regional conflicts, there were genuine trust issues involved in co-operation and sharing intelligence, and that these were hampering the search. International relations experts suggested that entrenched rivalries over sovereignty, security, intelligence, and national interests made meaningful multilateral co-operation very difficult. A Chinese academic made the observation that the parties were searching independently, and it was therefore not a multilateral search effort. The Guardian newspaper noted the Vietnamese permission given for Chinese aircraft to overfly its airspace as a positive sign of co-operation. Vietnam temporarily scaled back its search operations after the country's Deputy Transport Minister cited a lack of communication from Malaysian officials despite requests for more information. China, through the official Xinhua News Agency, urged the Malaysian government to take charge and conduct the operation with greater transparency, a point echoed by the Chinese Foreign Ministry days later.

Malaysia had initially declined to release raw data from its military radar, deeming the information "too sensitive", but later acceded. Defence experts suggested that giving others access to radar information could be sensitive on a military level, for example: "The rate at which they can take the picture can also reveal how good the radar system is." One suggested that some countries could already have had radar data on the aircraft, but were reluctant to share any information that could potentially reveal their defence capabilities and compromise their own security. Similarly, submarines patrolling the South China Sea might have information in the event of a water impact, and sharing such information could reveal their locations and listening capabilities.

Criticism was also levelled at the delay of the search efforts. On 11 March 2014, three days after the aircraft disappeared, British satellite company Inmarsat (or its partner, SITA) had provided officials with data suggesting that the aircraft was nowhere near the areas in the Gulf of Thailand and the South China Sea being searched at the time, and that it may have diverted its course through a southern or northern corridor. This information was not acknowledged publicly until it was released by the Malaysian Prime Minister in a press conference on 15 March. Explaining why information about satellite signals had not been made available earlier, Malaysia Airlines stated that the raw satellite signals needed to be verified and analysed "so that their significance could be properly understood" before it could publicly confirm their existence. Acting Transport Minister Hishammuddin claimed that Malaysian and US investigators had immediately discussed the Inmarsat data upon receipt on 12 March, and that they had agreed to send the data to the US for further processing on two separate occasions. Data analysis was completed on 14 March, by which time the AAIB had independently arrived at the same conclusion.

In June 2014, relatives of passengers on Flight 370 began a crowdfunding campaign on Indiegogo to raise US$100,000—with an ultimate goal of raising US$5 million—as a reward to encourage anyone with knowledge of the location of Flight 370, or the cause of its disappearance, to reveal what they knew. The campaign, which ended on 8 August 2014, raised US$100,516 from 1,007 contributors.

Malaysia Airlines 

A month after the disappearance, Malaysia Airlines' chief executive Ahmad Jauhari Yahya acknowledged that ticket sales had declined but failed to provide specific details. This may have partially resulted from the suspension of the airline's advertising campaigns following the disappearance. Ahmad stated in an interview with The Wall Street Journal that the airline's "primary focus...is that we do take care of the families in terms of their emotional needs and also their financial needs. It is important that we provide answers for them. It is important that the world has answers, as well." In further remarks, Ahmad said he was not sure when the airline could start repairing its image, but that the airline was adequately insured to cover the financial loss stemming from Flight 370's disappearance. In China, where the majority of passengers were from, bookings on Malaysia Airlines were down 60% in March.

Malaysia Airlines retired the MH370 flight number and replaced it with MH318 (Flight 318) beginning 14 March 2014. This follows a common practice among airlines to redesignate flights after notorious accidents. Flight 318—Malaysia Airline's second scheduled daily service to Beijing—was suspended seven weeks later, on 2 May; according to insiders, this was due to lack of demand.

Malaysia Airlines was given US$110 million from insurers in March 2014 to cover initial payments to passengers' families and the search effort. In May, remarks from lead reinsurer of the flight, Allianz, indicated the insured market loss on Flight 370, including the search, was about US$350 million.

Financial troubles 
At the time of Flight 370's disappearance, Malaysia Airlines was struggling to cut costs to compete with a wave of new, low-cost carriers in the region. In the previous three years, Malaysia Airlines had booked losses of: RM1.17 billion (US$356 million) in 2013, RM433 million in 2012, and RM2.5 billion in 2011. Malaysia Airlines lost RM443.4 million (US$137.4 million) in the first quarter of 2014 (January–March). The second quarter—the first full quarter in the aftermath of Flight 370's disappearance—saw a loss of RM307.04 million (US$97.6 million), representing a 75% increase over losses from the second quarter of 2013. Industry analysts expected Malaysia Airlines to lose further market share and face a challenging environment to stand out from competitors while addressing its financial plight. The company's stock, down as much as 20% following the disappearance of Flight 370, had fallen 80% over the previous five years, in contrast to a rise in the Malaysian stock market of about 80% over the same period.

Many analysts and the media suggested that Malaysia Airlines would need to rebrand and repair its image and/or require government assistance to return to profitability. The loss of Flight 17 in July greatly exacerbated Malaysia Airline's financial problems. The combined effect on consumer confidence of the loss of Flight 370 and Flight 17, and the airline's poor financial performance, led Khazanah Nasional—the majority shareholder (69.37%) and a Malaysian state-run investment arm—to announce on 8 August its plan to purchase the remainder of the airline, thereby renationalising it. Malaysia Airlines renationalised on 1 September 2015.

Compensation for passengers' next of kin 
Lack of evidence in determining the cause of Flight 370's disappearance, as well as the absence of any physical confirmation that the airplane crashed, raises many issues regarding responsibility for the accident and the payments made by insurance agencies. Under the Montreal Convention, it is the carrier's responsibility to prove lack of fault in an accident and each passenger's next of kin are automatically entitled, regardless of fault, to a payment of approximately US$175,000 from the airline's insurance company—amounting to a total of almost US$40 million for the 227 passengers on board.

Malaysia Airlines was also vulnerable to civil action from passengers' families. Compensation awarded during civil cases (or settlements reached out of court) was likely to vary widely among passengers, based on the country where the proceedings were to take place. An American court could be expected to award upwards of US$8–10 million, while Chinese courts would be likely to award a small fraction of that amount. Despite the announcement that the flight ended in the southern Indian Ocean, it was not until 29 January 2015 that the Malaysian government officially declared Flight 370 an accident with no survivors, a move that would allow compensation claims to be made. The first civil case relating to the disappearance was filed in October 2014—even before Flight 370 had been declared an accident—on behalf of two Malaysian boys whose father was a passenger; they were claiming for negligence in failing to contact the aircraft soon after it was lost and for breach of contract for failing to bring the passenger to his destination. Additional civil proceedings against Malaysia Airlines were filed in China and Malaysia.

Soon after the disappearance of Flight 370, Malaysia Airlines offered ex gratia condolence payments to families of the passengers. In China, the families were offered ¥31,000 (approx. US$5,000) "comfort money", but some rejected the offer. It was also reported that Malaysian relatives received only $2,000. In June 2014, Malaysia's deputy Foreign Minister Hamzah Zainuddin said that families of seven passengers received $50,000 advance compensation from Malaysia Airlines, but that full payout would come after the aircraft was found, or officially declared lost (which later occurred in January 2015).

Malaysia

Before 2016
Air force experts raised questions and the Malaysian opposition levelled criticisms about the state of Malaysia's air force and radar capabilities. Many criticised the failure of the Royal Malaysian Air Force to identify and respond to an unidentified aircraft (later determined to be Flight 370) flying through Malaysian airspace. The Malaysian military became aware of the unidentified aircraft only after reviewing radar recordings several hours after the flight's disappearance. The failure to recognise and react to the unidentified aircraft was a security breach, and was also a missed opportunity to intercept Flight 370 and prevent the time-consuming and expensive search operation.

The Malaysian Prime Minister, Najib Razak, responded to criticism of his government in an opinion piece published in The Wall Street Journal in which he acknowledged mistakes had been made, and said time would show that Malaysia had done its best, had helped co-ordinate the search, and would continue to provide support. Najib went on to emphasise the need for the aviation industry to "not only learn the lessons of MH370 but implement them," saying in closing that "the world learned from Air France Flight 447 but didn't act. The same mistake must not be made again."

Opposition leader Anwar Ibrahim criticised the Malaysian government regarding its response to Flight 370's disappearance and the military's response when Flight 370 turned back over the Malay Peninsula; he called for an international committee to take charge of the investigation "to save the image of the country and to save the country." Malaysian authorities have accused Anwar—who was jailed on contentious charges the day before Flight 370 disappeared—of politicising the crisis. Flight 370's captain was a supporter of Anwar and the two men were acquainted.

Questioned about why Malaysia did not scramble fighter jets to intercept the aircraft as it tracked back across the Malay Peninsula, acting Transport Minister Hishammuddin noted that it was deemed a commercial aircraft and was not hostile, remarking: "If you're not going to shoot it down, what's the point of sending [a fighter jet] up?" According to former air force pilot major Ahmad Zaidi of RMAF Butterworth, no pilot stays on the base during the night, so the aircraft could not have been intercepted.

The response to the crisis and lack of transparency in the response brought attention to the state of media in Malaysia. After decades of tight media control, during which government officials were accustomed to passing over issues without scrutiny or accountability, Malaysia was suddenly thrust into the spotlight of the global media and unable to adjust to demands for transparency.

March 2020 
On 8 March 2020, six years after the disappearance, two memorial events were held to mark the anniversary. Families of MH370 passengers called for a new search for the flight in a bid to seek closure. Malaysia's former Transport Minister Anthony Loke had attended one of the events, expressing regret at being unable to table the compensation documents at the Cabinet level as per his original intent. The families hoped that the new Transport Minister Wee Ka Siong could expedite the compensation matters.

Malaysia's transport ministry secretary-general, Datuk Isham Ishak, stated that he had already submitted a request to meet the Prime Minister (Muhyiddin Yassin) the following week of 15 to 22 March so that he could present the paper on compensation for the families of MH370 victims, and that the ministry would also continue to seek support from the new government to resume the search for the missing aircraft.

China 
Chinese Deputy Foreign Minister Xie Hangsheng reacted sceptically to the conclusion by the Malaysian government that the aircraft had gone down with no survivors, demanding on 24 March 2014 "all the relevant information and evidence about the satellite data analysis", and said that the Malaysian government must "finish all the work including search and rescue." The following day, Chinese president Xi Jinping sent a special envoy to Kuala Lumpur to consult with the Malaysian government over the missing aircraft.

Relatives of passengers 
In the days following the disappearance of Flight 370, relatives of those on board became increasingly frustrated at the lack of news. On 25 March 2014, around two hundred family members of the Chinese passengers protested outside the Malaysian embassy in Beijing. Relatives who had arrived in Kuala Lumpur after the announcement continued with their protest, accusing Malaysia of hiding the truth and harbouring a murderer. They also wanted an apology from the Malaysian government for its poor initial handling of the disaster and its "premature" conclusion of total loss, drawn without any physical evidence. An op-ed in state media outlet China Daily said that Malaysia was not wholly to be blamed for its poor handling of such a "bizarre" and "unprecedented crisis," and appealed to the Chinese relatives not to allow emotions to prevail over evidence and rationality. The Chinese ambassador to Malaysia defended the Malaysian government's response, stating that the "radical and irresponsible opinions [of the relatives] do not represent the views of Chinese people and the Chinese government". The ambassador also strongly criticised Western media for having "published false news, stoked conflict and even spread rumours" to the detriment of relatives and of Sino–Malaysian relations. On the other hand, a US Department of Defense official criticised China for what he perceived as providing apparently false leads that detracted from the search effort and wasted time and resources.

In July 2019, Beijing-based family members of some MH370 victims received notice from Malaysia Airlines that from July 2019 onwards, MAS would discontinue the "Meet the Families" discussion sessions in Beijing, China. This came after around 50 sessions had taken place.

Boycotts 
Some Chinese citizens boycotted all things Malaysian, including holidays and singers, in protest of Malaysia's handling of the Flight 370 investigation. Bookings on Malaysia Airlines from China, where the majority of passengers were from, were down 60% in March. In late March, several major Chinese ticketing agencies—eLong, LY.com, Qunar, and Mango—discontinued the sale of airline tickets to Malaysia and several large Chinese travel agencies reported a 50% drop in tourists compared to the same period the year before. China was the third-largest source of visitors to Malaysia prior to Flight 370's disappearance, accounting for 1.79 million tourists in 2013. One market analyst predicted a 20–40% drop in Chinese tourists to Malaysia, resulting in a loss of 4–8 billion yuan (RM2.1–4.2 billion; US$0.65–1.3 billion).

The boycotts were largely led or supported by celebrities. Film star Chen Kun posted a message to Weibo—where he had 70 million followers—stating that he would be boycotting Malaysia until its government told the truth. The post was shared over 70,000 times and drew over 30,000 comments. More than 337,000 people retweeted a tweet from TV host Meng Fei, that said he would join the boycott.

China and Malaysia had previously nominated 2014 to be the "Malaysia–China Friendship Year" to celebrate 40 years of diplomatic relations between the two countries.

Air transport industry 
The fact that a modern aircraft could disappear in a digitally connected world was met with surprise and disbelief by the public. While changes in the aviation industry often take years to be implemented, airlines and air transport authorities responded swiftly to take action on several measures to reduce the likelihood of a similar incident.

Aircraft tracking 

The International Air Transport Association (IATA)—an industry trade organisation representing more than 240 airlines (accounting for 84% of global air traffic)—and the ICAO began working on implementing new measures to track aircraft in flight in real time. The IATA created a task force (which included several outside stakeholders) to define a minimal set of requirements that any tracking system must meet, allowing airlines to decide the best solution to track their aircraft. The IATA's task force planned to come up with several short-, medium-, and long-term solutions to ensure that information is provided in a timely manner to support search, rescue, and recovery activities in the wake of an aircraft accident. The task force was expected to provide a report to the ICAO on 30 September 2014, but announced on that date that the report would be delayed, citing the need for further clarification on some issues. In December 2014, the IATA task force recommended that, within 12 months, airlines track commercial aircraft in no longer than 15-minute intervals. The IATA itself did not support the deadline, which it believed could not be met by all airlines, but the proposed standard had the support of the ICAO. Although the ICAO can set standards, it has no legal authority and such standards must be adopted by member states.

In 2016, the ICAO adopted a standard that, by November 2018, all aircraft over open ocean report their position every 15 minutes. In March, the ICAO approved an amendment to the Chicago Convention requiring new aircraft manufactured after 1 January 2021 to have autonomous tracking devices which could send location information at least once per minute in distress circumstances.

In May 2014, Inmarsat said that it would offer its tracking service for free to all aircraft equipped with an Inmarsat satellite connection (which includes the vast majority of commercial airliners). Inmarsat also changed the time period for handshakes with its terminals from one hour to 15 minutes.

Transponders 
There was a call for automated transponders after the terrorist attacks of 11 September 2001; no changes were made because aviation experts preferred flexible control, in case of malfunctions or electrical emergencies. In the aftermath of Flight 370's disappearance, the air transport industry was still resistant to the installation of automated transponders, which would likely entail significant costs. Pilots also criticised changes of this kind, insisting on the need to cut power to equipment in the event of a fire. Nonetheless, new types of tamper-proof circuit breakers were being considered.

Flight recorders 

The intensive and urgent search for the flight recorders in early April 2014, due to the 30-day battery life of the underwater locator beacons (ULBs) (or "pingers") attached to them, drew attention to their inherent limitations. The maximum distance from the ULBs at which the signal can be detected is normally , or  under favourable conditions. Even if the flight recorders are located, the cockpit voice recorder memory has the capacity to store only two hours of data, continuously recording over the oldest data. This storage capacity complies with regulations, which take account of the fact that it is usually only the data recordings from the last section of a flight that are needed to determine the cause of an accident. However, the events that led to Flight 370 diverting from its course, before disappearing, took place more than two hours before the flight ended. Given these shortcomings, and the importance of the data stored on flight recorders, Flight 370 has brought to attention new technologies that enable data streaming to the ground.

A call to increase the battery life of ULBs was made following the unsuccessful initial search in 2009 for the flight recorders on Air France Flight 447, which were not located until 2011. A formal recommendation that the ULB design be upgraded to offer a longer battery life, or to make the recorders ejectable, had been included in the final report of the board of inquiry into the loss of South African Airways Flight 295 over the Indian Ocean in 1987, but it was not until 2014 that the ICAO made such a recommendation, with implementation required by 2018. The European Aviation Safety Agency (EASA) issued new regulations that require the transmitting time of ULBs fitted to aircraft flight recorders to be increased from 30 to 90 days, to be implemented by 1 January 2020. The agency has also proposed that a new underwater locator beacon with a greater range of transmission should be fitted to aircraft that fly over oceans. In June 2015, Dukane, a manufacturer of underwater locator beacons, began selling beacons with a 90-day battery life.

In March 2016, the ICAO adopted several amendments to the Chicago Convention in order to address issues raised by the disappearance of Flight 370. These affected aircraft manufactured after 2020, requiring cockpit voice recorders to record at least 25 hours of data, to ensure that all phases of a flight are recorded. Aircraft designs approved after 2020 must incorporate a means of recovering the flight recorders, or the information contained on them, before the recorders sink below the water. This provision is performance-based so that it can be accomplished by different techniques, such as streaming flight recorder data from a stricken aircraft, or using flight recorders that eject from the aircraft and float on the surface of the water. The new regulations do not require modifications to be made to existing aircraft.

Safety recommendations 
In January 2015, the US National Transportation Safety Board cited Flight 370 and Air France Flight 447 when it issued eight safety recommendations related to locating aircraft wreckage in remote or underwater locations; and repeated recommendations for a crash-protected cockpit image recorder and tamper-resistant flight recorders and transponders.

In popular culture 
The disappearance of Malaysia Airlines Flight 370 has been described as "one of the biggest mysteries in modern aviation history".

Several documentaries have been produced about the flight. The Smithsonian Channel aired a one-hour documentary on 6 April 2014, titled Malaysia 370: The Plane That Vanished, and the Discovery Channel broadcast a one-hour documentary about Flight 370 on 16 April 2014, titled Flight 370: The Missing Links.

On 17 June 2014, an episode of the television documentary series Horizon, titled "Where Is Flight MH370?" was broadcast on BBC Two. The programme, narrated by Amanda Drew, documents how the aircraft disappeared, what experts believe to have happened to it, and how the search has unfolded. It also examines new technologies, such as flight recorder streaming and automatic dependent surveillance – broadcast (ADS-B), which may help prevent similar disappearances in the future. The programme concludes by noting that Ocean Shield had spent two months searching  of ocean, but that it had searched far to the north of the Inmarsat "hotspot" on the final arc, at approximately 28 degrees south, where the aircraft was most likely to have crashed. On 8 October 2014, a modified version of the Horizon programme was broadcast in the US by PBS as an episode of NOVA, titled "Why Planes Vanish", with a different narrator.

The aviation disaster documentary television series Mayday (also known as Air Crash Investigation and Air Emergency) produced an episode on the disaster, titled "What Happened to Malaysian 370?" The episode aired in the UK on 8 March 2015, the first anniversary of Flight 370's disappearance. In August 2018, the television series Drain the Oceans, which airs on the National Geographic channel, highlighted the disaster, the methods used in the search, and the potential discoveries.

Panoply made a podcast story loosely based on the disappearance of MH370, called "Passenger List", featuring the voice of Kelly Marie Tran as the lead character.

Jeff Rake, creator of the NBC show Manifest, said that after he had pitched his idea for the show without any success, the MH370 disappearance led to the TV network's sudden interest.

The podcast Stuff You Should Know released a two-part episode discussing the case, titled "The Disappearance of Flight MH370", on 7 and 9 January 2020. Black Box Down, a podcast detailing aviation accidents, also had an episode covering the incident released on 18 June 2020.

The first work of fiction about the incident was MH370: A Novella, by New Zealand author Scott Maka.

In 2022, a three-part documentary series was released, titled MH370: The Lost Flight, was released.

On the ninth anniversary of the flight's disappearance, 8 March 2023, a three-part docuseries, MH370: The Plane That Disappeared premiered on Netflix.

See also 

 List of accidents and incidents involving commercial aircraft
 List of missing aircraft
 List of people who disappeared mysteriously at sea
 List of unrecovered flight recorders
 List of unsolved deaths

Explanatory notes

References

Further reading 
 Joint Agency Coordination Centre (JACC)
 
 ATSB investigation of Flight 370  – webpage of Australian Transport Safety Bureau's investigation (Investigation number: AE-2014-054; Investigation title: "Assistance to Malaysian Ministry of Transport in support of missing Malaysia Airlines flight MH370 on 7 March 2014 UTC")
 ICAO statement on the first anniversary of the Flight 370 disappearance
 The data behind the search for MH370 – Interactive analysis of phase 1 sea-floor mapping data from Geoscience Australia
 Missing flight MH370 – a visual guide to the parts and debris found so far (January 2017) – detailed information about debris
 Summary of possible MH370 debris recovered (April 2017)
 
 MH 370 Preliminary Report – Preliminary report issued by the Malaysian Ministry of Transport, dated 9 April 2014 and released to the public on 1 May 2014.
 Factual Information: Safety Investigation for MH370 – Interim report released by the Malaysian Ministry of Transport on 8 March 2015 (586 pages).
 MH370 – Definition of Underwater Search Areas  (2014) – Report by the Australian Transport Safety Bureau, released on 26 June 2014, and the most comprehensive report on Flight 370 publicly released at that time. The report focuses on defining the search area for the fifth phase, but in doing so provides a comprehensive overview/examination of satellite data, the failed searches, and possible "end-of-flight scenarios".
 MH370 – Definition of Underwater Search Areas  (2015) – Report by the Australian Transport Safety Bureau, released on 3 December 2015, covering the Bayesian method analysis made by Australia's Defence Science and Technology Group and other developments since mid-2014 in defining the search area.
 MH370 – Search and debris examination update  (2016) – Report by the Australian Transport Safety Bureau, released on 2 November 2016, comprising further analysis of satellite data, additional End of Flight simulations, analysis of flight debris (wing flap), and enhanced debris drift modelling.
 MH370 First Principles Review and CSIRO reports  – Report by the Australian Transport Safety Bureau, released on 20 December 2016, documenting the proceedings and outcomes of the First Principles Review meeting held in Canberra between 2–4 November 2016.
 The search for MH370 and ocean surface drift – Part III  – Report by CSIRO to the Australian Transport Safety Bureau, released on 16 August 2017. From the results of drift studies, CSIRO mentions that it is possible to identify a most-likely location of the aircraft, with unprecedented precision and certainty, at 35.6°S 92.8°E, northeast of the main 120,000-km2 underwater search zone.
 Summary of imagery analyses for non-natural objects  – Report by Geoscience Australia, released on 16 August 2017, comprising analysis of imagery from the PLEIADES 1A satellite, of floating objects identified in the southern Indian Ocean.
 The Operational Search for MH370 (Final)  – Final report issued by the Australian Transport Safety Bureau (ATSB), released on 3 October 2017, documenting where and how the search for MH370 was conducted, the results obtained, and analysis for where future underwater searches could be undertaken. It concludes that the reasons for the loss of MH370 cannot be established with certainty until the aircraft is located.
 Safety Investigation Report by The Malaysian ICAO Annex 13 Safety Investigation Team for MH370  with appendices  – Final report issued by the Malaysian Ministry of Transport, dated 2 July 2018 and released to the public on 30 July 2018.

External links 

  – maintained by the Malaysian government
 Joint Agency Coordination Centre (JACC)
 Australian Maritime Safety Authority MH370 Search – Media kit
 Australian Transport Safety Bureau 
 Malaysia Airlines
 Malaysian Ministry of Transport
 US Department of Defense

 
2010s missing person cases
2014 in Australia
2014 in China
2014 in international relations
2014 in Malaysia
Accidents and incidents involving the Boeing 777
Airliner accidents and incidents with an unknown cause
Articles containing video clips
Australia–China relations
Australia–Malaysia relations
Aviation accidents and incidents in 2014
Aviation accidents and incidents in the Indian Ocean
Aviation accidents and incidents in Malaysia
China–Malaysia relations
Malaysia Airlines accidents and incidents
March 2014 events in Asia
Missing aircraft
People lost at sea